This list contains the names of albums that contain a hidden track and also information on how to find them. Not all printings of an album contain the same track arrangements, so some copies of a particular album may not have the hidden track(s) listed below. Some of these tracks may be hidden in the pregap, and some hidden simply as a track following the listed tracks. The list is ordered by artist name using the surname where appropriate.

 HammerFall, Chapter V: Unbent, Unbowed, Unbroken: "Knights of the 21st Century" is followed by almost two minutes of silence and a short hidden track (0:15).
 Hangnail (Christian band): Hangnail (1999): The last song "Where did the Time Go?" ends at 3:02. After 3 minutes of silence (3:02 - 6:02), begins an untitled hidden track: band members screaming and tuning can be heard. The hidden track ends at 8:13, closing the album. 
 H-Blockx:
 Discover My Soul: track 14 starts with 10 minutes of silence, followed by an untitled instrumental track
 Fly Eyes: "It Is" starts playing 4 minutes after "Paradise Valley."
 Steve Hackett:
 Spectral Mornings. On some early CD pressings, track 8 (the title track) was followed by silence and then "The Caretaker," a short spoken piece wherein singer Pete Hicks pretends to be a janitor cleaning up the studio. (This piece also appears as track 16, still unlisted, on the 2005 remastered version of the album.)
 Guitar Noir. On the original U.S. version of the CD, track 13 is "Cassandra," an unlisted song sung by Hackett and featuring Brian May of Queen on guitar. (A different recording of the song, recorded in 1986 and sung by Chris Thompson, was later released on Feedback 86.)
 Luke Haines: Das Capital: Rewind from first track to hear the "overture"
 Haggard, Eppur Si Muove: Untitled hidden track at the end of the album.
 Halo Original Soundtrack, composed by Martin O'Donnell and Michael Salvatori, features the hidden track "The Siege of Madrigal" after the final track "Halo."
 Halo 3 Original Soundtrack, composed by Martin O'Donnell and Michael Salvatori, features a hidden track titled 'LvUrFr3nz' by Princeton. The song's title is derived from leetspeek, and means 'Love Your Friends.' The lyrics focus on Halo 3 Multiplayer.
 Hanson, Underneath. 3 minutes after the last track "Believe," there is an instrumental piece followed by an untitled song 1-minute after the end of the instrumental.
 Hayden, Everything I Long For: "Kraft Dinner & Poledo's Club Sandwich" are the unlisted final tracks on the original Hardwood Records CD. 
 Hayden, Moving Careful EP: "Winter Trip" is the second last unlisted track on the CD. The final hidden track is roughly 45 minutes or rain audio. 
 Hayden, Skyscraper National Park: "Mingus" is the unlisted pre-gap track at the start of the CD. 
 Gemma Hayes, Night on My Side. The hidden track "Dartmouth Square" appears at the end of track 9, and "Pieces of Glass" appears at the end of track 12.
 Corey Harris: Lamb's Bread Reprise (2005): "Daily Bread" (on the end of track 13, "The Peach")
 George Harrison, Brainwashed. After the final track (track 12) is a concluding prayer, the "Namah Parvati," chanted by Harrison and his son Dhani Harrison in unison.
 Beth Hart, Screamin' for My Supper: On Track 13, "Favorite Things" ends at 3:25, then silence until 3:50 when the hidden track "House of Sin" begins.
 Heavy Heavy Low Low, Everything's Watched, Everyone's Watching: Acoustic version of There's a Bat 80secs after the last track.
 Hed PE:
 Hed PE: "Tits, Clits and Bong Hits" at the end of the album
 Broke: Outtakes, alternate takes, inside jokes at the end of the album
 Hella: ""Chirpin Hard": After the final track, there is an untitled hidden track. After the hidden track fades out, there is a continued silence with the occasional burst of someone saying "yeah."
 Hevia, Tierra de Nadie: "Corri Corri" at the end of the album
 Scott Henderson, Tore Down House: At the end of the album and the song "Same As You," all the edited "count-ins" to each song are clearly heard, some of which also include conversations previously carried on before each song.
 Hi-Standard, Angry Fist: A punk cover of the "Pink Panther" theme is placed at 3:48 of the last track.
 John Hiatt, Walk On -After the last song there are 2 minutes of train sound effects (instead of  silence), followed by the song "Mile High."
 MJ Hibbett: Shed Anthems: A cover of Boom! Shake the Room by DJ Jazzy Jeff and the Fresh Prince is included after the last track on the album
The Higher, On Fire: An unnamed bonus track begins at 4:20 in track 12, "Pace Yourself (Patrick Stump remix)"
 Faith Hill: Fireflies, "Paris" is not listed as Track 14.
 Lauryn Hill, The Miseducation of Lauryn Hill: Following the title track, 2 unlisted songs, "Can't Take My Eyes Off of You" and "Tell Him" appear as separate tracks. The former became so popular, it was announced on the cover sticker and nominated for a Grammy.
 Hilltop Hoods, The Calling: There is a song in the pregap called Simmy and the Gravyspitters (instead of the interlude).
 HIM, Greatest Love Songs Vol. 666: The last one and a half min. of track 66.
 Hit the Lights, This Is a Stick Up... Don't Make It a Murder: "Her Eyes Say Yes"
 The Hoax: Humdinger: untitled (4:38) track beginning some 30 secs after the last (tenth) track
 The Hoosiers, The Trick to Life: "The Feeling You Get When" begins after the final (eleventh) track
 Hootie & the Blowfish:
 Cracked Rear View: "Motherless Child," a traditional spiritual at the end of the album
 Musical Chairs: "Closet Full of Fear," a hidden song at the end of the album
 Hooverphonic: Blue Wonder Power Milk, unlisted track at the end of the album (which carries the same name)
 Hope of the States, The Lost Riots: after several minutes of silence at the end of 1776
 The Horrors, Strange House: Death at the Chapel, at the end of the album
 Hurt, Goodbye to the Machine: The song "Flowers" begins after a period of silence on the last track, "That (Such a Thing)."
 Hurts, Happiness (Hurts album), after a period of silence after the last track "The Water," the song "Verona" plays.
 Hybrid:
 Morning Sci-Fi: "Lights Go Down, Knives Come Out," found by rewinding first track
 I Choose Noise: "Everything Is Brand New," rewind track 1 to around -3 mins to hear

See also
 List of backmasked messages
 List of albums with tracks hidden in the pregap

References 

H